Sloane Stephens was the defending champion, but did not participate this year as she was recovering from foot surgery.

Daria Kasatkina won her first WTA Tour title, defeating Jeļena Ostapenko in the final, 6–3, 6–1. This was the first final between two teenage players on the WTA tour since Yanina Wickmayer defeated Petra Kvitová at the 2009 Linz tournament.

Seeds
The top eight seeds received a bye into the second round.

Draw

Finals

Top half

Section 1

Section 2

Bottom half

Section 3

Section 4

Qualifying

Seeds

Qualifiers

Lucky losers

Draw

First qualifier

Second qualifier

Third qualifier

Fourth qualifier

Fifth qualifier

Sixth qualifier

Seventh qualifier

Eighth qualifier

References

 Main Draw
 Qualifying Draw

2017 WTA Tour
2017 Singles